Kingman–Norwich USD 331 is a public unified school district headquartered in Kingman, Kansas, United States.  The district includes the communities of Kingman, Norwich, Anness, Calista, Cleveland, Milton, Murdock, Rago, Spivey, Suppesville, Varner, Waterloo, and nearby rural areas.

Schools
The school district operates the following schools:
 Kingman High School
 Kingman Elementary-Middle School
 Norwich School

See also
 Kansas State Department of Education
 Kansas State High School Activities Association
 List of high schools in Kansas
 List of unified school districts in Kansas

References

External links
 

School districts in Kansas